Exocarpos is a genus of flowering shrubs and small trees in the sandalwood family, Santalaceae. They are found throughout Southeast Asia, Australia and the Pacific Islands.

They are semi-parasitic, requiring the roots of a host tree, a trait they share with many other members of the Santalaceae.

In Australia, they are known as ballarts, and several species are known as cherries.

Within Australia, an identification key is available for New South Wales species, and for Victorian species.

Exocarpos species 
                                                           Exocarpos aphyllus R.Br. - Leafless ballart, jointed cherry
                                                           Exocarpos bidwillii Hook. - "Takana". New Zealand
                                                           Exocarpos cupressiformis Labill. - Cherry ballart, cypress cherry
                                                           Exocarpos dasystachys Schltdl.
                                                           Exocarpos floribunda Domin
                                                           Exocarpos gaudichaudii A.DC. - Hulumoa (Hawaii)
                                                           Exocarpos glandulacea Miq. 
                                                           Exocarpos homalocladus C.Moore & F.Muell. - Grass tree
                                                           Exocarpos humifusus R.Br.
                                                           Exocarpos latifolius R.Br. - Broad-leaved cherry
                                                           Exocarpos leptomerioides Miq.
                                                           Exocarpos luteolus Forbes - Heau (Island of Kauai in Hawaii)
                                                           Exocarpos menziesii Stauffer - Heau (Hawaii)
                                                           Exocarpos nanus Hook.f. - Alpine ballart
                                                           Exocarpos odoratus (Miq.) A.DC. - Scented ballart
                                                           Exocarpos pendula F.Muell.
                                                           Exocarpos sparteus R.Br. - Broom ballart, slender cherry
                                                           Exocarpos strictus R.Br. - Pale-fruit ballart, dwarf cherry
                                                           Exocarpos syrticola  (F.Muell. ex Miq.) Stauffer - Coast ballart

References

External links
What's Its Name?
FloraBase - The West Australian Flora: Exocarpos
PlantNet - New South Wales Flora Online: Exocarpos

 
Santalales genera